Licinius of Evreux  was the fifth Bishop of Évreux in France.

He is known as a signatory to the Councils of Orléans of 538, 541 and 549.

References

6th-century Frankish bishops
Year of birth unknown
Bishops of Évreux